Mount Carthew is a  mountain summit located in Waterton Lakes National Park, in the Canadian Rockies of Alberta, Canada.

Mount Carthew was named after William Morden Carthew, a World War I casualty.

See also
List of mountains of Alberta

References

External links
 Mount Carthew photo: Flickr

Carthew
Carthew